Lorenzo Daniel Ludlow Kuri (born 10 August 1961) is a Mexican politician affiliated with the National Action Party. As of 2014 he served as Deputy of the LX Legislature of the Mexican Congress representing Hidalgo.

References

1961 births
Living people
National Action Party (Mexico) politicians
21st-century Mexican politicians
Monterrey Institute of Technology and Higher Education alumni
Politicians from Hidalgo (state)
Deputies of the LX Legislature of Mexico
Members of the Chamber of Deputies (Mexico) for Hidalgo (state)